The Cabinet of the Cook Islands is the policy and decision-making body of the executive branch of the Cook Islands Government.  It consists of the Prime Minister and a number of other Ministers, who are collectively responsible to Parliament.

Legislative basis

Unlike other Commonwealth Realms, the Cook Islands Cabinet has a formal legislative basis in the Cook Islands Constitution.  Cabinet consists of the Prime Minister and up to six other ministers.  Members are appointed by the King's Representative on advice of the Prime Minister, and must be Members of Parliament.

All Cabinet ministers also serve as members of the Executive Council, which advises the King's Representative.  Cabinet decisions take effect after four days, or when formally confirmed by the Executive Council.

Current members

The Cook Islands Cabinet consists of:

Cabinet ministers

References

External links
 Cook Islands Government
 Cook Islands Constitution

Cook Islands
Politics of the Cook Islands
Political organisations based in the Cook Islands